Haʻapai 12 is an electoral constituency for the Legislative Assembly in the Kingdom of Tonga. It was established for the November 2010 general election, when the multi-seat regional constituencies for People's Representatives were replaced by single-seat constituencies, electing one representative via the first past the post electoral system. Located in the Haʻapai island group, it encompasses the villages of Pangai, Hihifo, Ha‘ato‘u, Navea, Holopeka, Koulo, ‘Uiha, Felemea, and Lofanga. It is one of two constituencies in Haʻapai, the other being Haʻapai 13. (The number does not mean that it is the twelfth in Haʻapai, but in the country.)

Its first ever representative was Moʻale Finau, a first time MP, of the Democratic Party of the Friendly Islands. He lost the seat in 2014 to Viliami Hingano, regained it in 2017, then lost it again to Hingano in 2021. Finau regained the seat at the 2022 Ha’apai 12 by-election following Hingano's death.

Members of Parliament

Election results

2010

References

Tongan legislative constituencies
2010 establishments in Tonga
Constituencies established in 2010
Haʻapai